Personal transport may refer to:

Personal transporter, a class of compact motorised ridable vehicle for transporting individuals
Personal public transport, rental vehicles distributed and available without booking to the general public where users can determine the route and schedule
Personal rapid transit (people mover), a public transport mode with small automated vehicles with low passenger capacity on a network of guideways